The Profiteers is a lost 1919 silent film drama directed by George Fitzmaurice and starring Fannie Ward.  It was produced by Astra Films and released through Pathé Exchange.

Cast
Fannie Ward - Beverly Randall
John Miltern - Richard Randall
Leslie Stuart - Tony Terle
Edwin Stevens - Everett Dearing

References

External links

1919 films
American silent feature films
Lost American films
Films directed by George Fitzmaurice
Films with screenplays by Ouida Bergère
American black-and-white films
Silent American drama films
1919 drama films
Pathé Exchange films
1919 lost films
Lost drama films
1910s American films